The canton of Le Montet is a former administrative division in central France. It was disbanded following the French canton reorganisation which came into effect in March 2015. It consisted of 11 communes, which joined the canton of Souvigny in 2015. It had 5,115 inhabitants (2012).

The canton comprised the following communes:

Châtel-de-Neuvre
Châtillon
Cressanges
Deux-Chaises
Meillard
Le Montet
Rocles
Saint-Sornin
Le Theil
Treban
Tronget

Demographics

See also
Cantons of the Allier department

References

Former cantons of Allier
2015 disestablishments in France
States and territories disestablished in 2015